Sally Ellen Walton (born 10 June 1981) is a former British field hockey player, a personal trainer and currently coaching Hockey at the Royal Grammar School Worcester, moving there from Solihull school

Walton made her international debut in 2005. At the 2012 Summer Olympics, she competed for the Great Britain in the women's tournament helping them to win the bronze medal.

Walton has played club hockey for Bowdon Hightown and Hampton-in-Arden Hockey Club and currently plays for Olton and West Warwickshire. She coaches at RGS Worcester and lectures at Solihull College. She holds a Sports Science Degree from Liverpool John Moores University.

Walton once played football for Aston Villa L.F.C.

References

External links 
 

1981 births
Living people
English female field hockey players
Field hockey players at the 2012 Summer Olympics
Olympic field hockey players of Great Britain
Olympic medalists in field hockey
Olympic bronze medallists for Great Britain
Medalists at the 2012 Summer Olympics
Alumni of Liverpool John Moores University
Aston Villa W.F.C. players
Commonwealth Games bronze medallists for England
Commonwealth Games medallists in field hockey
Women's association football fullbacks
People from Southport
English women's footballers
Field hockey players at the 2010 Commonwealth Games
Teachers at Royal Grammar School Worcester
Medallists at the 2010 Commonwealth Games